Ansonia spinulifer, also known as spiny slender toad or Kina Balu stream toad, is a species of true toad in the family Bufonidae.
It is found in Sarawak and Sabah, northern Borneo (Malaysia), and presumably also in Kalimantan on the Indonesian part of the island.

Description
Tympanum is visible. Dorsum has big spinose warts and usually a light spot between the shoulders. The warts are large and have keratinized projections, hence the species name. Tadpoles have the typical sucker mouth of rheophilous Ansonia tadpoles.

Habitat and conservation
Its natural habitats are lowland rainforests at elevations of  asl. Adults range widely over the floor and herb stratum in areas of steep terrain, but breeding requires small, clear, rocky-bottomed streams. Males call at night, sitting in low vegetation close to streams. The tadpoles live in torrents; they cling to rocks and feed on lithophytes.

Ansonia spinulifer is common in Sarawak, but it seems not to adapt to habitat modification. It is threatened by habitat loss (deforestation and the associated siltation of streams; plantations).

References

spinulifer
Endemic fauna of Borneo
Endemic fauna of Malaysia
Amphibians of Malaysia
Taxa named by François Mocquard
Amphibians described in 1890
Taxonomy articles created by Polbot
Amphibians of Borneo
Borneo lowland rain forests